C+C Music Factory was an American musical group formed in 1989 by David Cole and Robert Clivillés. The group is best known for their five hit singles: "Gonna Make You Sweat (Everybody Dance Now)", "Here We Go (Let's Rock & Roll)", "Things That Make You Go Hmmm...", "Just a Touch of Love", and "Keep It Comin'". The band stopped recording in 1996, following Cole's death. In 2010, C+C Music Factory reformed with Eric Kupper replacing Cole. Original member Freedom Williams acquired trademark rights to the name in 2003 and still tours under that moniker.

C+C Music Factory have earned 35 music industry awards, including five Billboard Music Awards, five American Music Awards, and two MTV Video Music Awards. In December 2016, Billboard magazine ranked them as the 44th most successful dance artist of all time.

History

1987–1989: Early beginnings and The 28th Street Crew
David Cole and Robert Clivillés became friends when they both performed at the Better Days club (Clivillés as DJ and Cole as keyboardist) in the late 1980s. In 1987, Clivillés and Cole formed a short-lived house music group called 2 Puerto Ricans, a Blackman and a Dominican. The group also included David Morales (who, like Clivillés, was a resident DJ at Better Days) and Chep Nuñez. They released two minor hit singles, "Do It Properly" (1987) and "So Many Ways (Do It Properly Part II)" (1988). In 1989, they released their final single, "Scandalous", before disbanding.

Following the breakup of their previous group, Clivillés and Cole continued to record music together under the name The 28th Street Crew. In mid-1989, the duo released an album titled I Need a Rhythm. The album's title track and lead single, peaked at number three on Billboard's Dance chart. In September 1989, female group Seduction released their debut album Nothing Matters Without Love, which was entirely produced by Clivillés and Cole. Under the brief management of Clivillés and Cole, the group's album became certified gold-status in the United States.

1989–1993: C+C Music Factory and Gonna Make You Sweat

In 1989, Clivillés and Cole formed a new group known as C+C Music Factory. The group included Clivillés and Cole, in addition to rapper Freedom Williams and Liberian model-turned-singer Zelma Davis. In December 1990, C+C Music Factory released their debut album Gonna Make You Sweat, which peaked at number two on Billboard's Top 200 Albums chart. The album's lead single, "Gonna Make You Sweat (Everybody Dance Now)", which featured rap vocals by Freedom Williams and uncredited lead vocals by Martha Wash, became an international hit and peaked at number one on Billboards Hot 100. The single went on to sell over a million copies in the United States, becoming certified platinum-status. Additionally, the single became number-one in five other countries. The success of the single also bolstered its parent album's sales, helping it achieve multi-platinum status for sales exceeding five million copies in the United States.

In 1991, the group released two top-ten singles, "Here We Go (Let's Rock & Roll)" and "Things That Make You Go Hmmm..." (inspired by a phrase uttered periodically by late-night talk show host Arsenio Hall), both of which became certified gold-status in the United States. In August 1991, the album's final single, "Just a Touch of Love", was released and earned the group their fourth number-one dance hit. The song was also featured on the soundtrack of the musical comedy film Sister Act. In the same year, C+C Music Factory embarked on their first international tour. During certain legs of the tour, Deborah Cooper, a backing vocalist from their album, was hired as a lead vocalist for specific concert venues as Zelma Davis was awaiting green card clearance. In 1992, the group released the single "Keep It Comin' (Dance Till You Can't Dance No More)", featuring Cooper and rapper Q-Unique on vocals. The single became their fifth song to top the Billboard dance chart. The song was also featured on the soundtrack of the comedy horror film Buffy the Vampire Slayer. By the end of 1992, the group had earned a total of four American Music Awards, including an award for "Favorite Pop/Rock Band/Duo/Group".

1994–1996: Subsequent releases and hiatus
In 1994, C+C Music Factory experienced a lineup change. Wash, who had just settled a lawsuit with the group, was asked to join as a full-time vocalist. Williams left the group to pursue a solo career and was replaced by the vocal trio Trilogy. In August 1994, the group released their second album, titled Anything Goes!, which performed poorly on the Billboard's Top 200 Albums chart. The lead single, "Do You Wanna Get Funky", which featured vocals from Davis, Wash, and Trilogy, became a success on the Billboard charts and earned the group their sixth number-one dance hit. The album also featured two minor hits, "Take a Toke" and "I Found Love".

On 24 January 1995, David Cole died from spinal meningitis."C+C's David Cole dies at 32" NY Daily News, 25 January 1995 Despite the death of one of their core members, C+C Music Factory embarked on another international tour. In November 1995, they released their self-titled third album. The record was released by Robert Clivillés using the C+C Music Factory name, though it did not feature any musical contributions from Cole, Davis, or Wash, but retained the vocal contributions of Trilogy. The album's lead single, "I'll Always Be Around", became their seventh number-one dance hit. The second single, "Don't Stop the Remix", was the group's final release before disbanding.

In October 1996, Clivillés released an album of new material under the name Robi-Rob's Clubworld. That same year, a compilation album titled Robi Rob's Clubworld – House of Sound presents Clubworld Shut Up and Dance was released exclusively in Japan. The album contains past singles and unreleased material recorded by C+C Music Factory.

2010–2011: Comeback
C+C Music Factory reformed in 2010 with Eric Kupper replacing Cole. They released the song "Live Your Life", which featured singer Scarlett Santana, in early 2010, on a Bill Coleman's Remixxer Compilation album. In August 2011, Santana released the single "Rain", which was produced by C+C Music Factory (composed of Clivillés and Kupper credited as "CnC Music Factory").

Legacy
As of 1995, C+C Music Factory have accumulated a total of seven number-one dance songs. "Gonna Make You Sweat (Everybody Dance Now)" was included in the top-ten VH1's "100 Greatest Dance Songs".

In 2003, Freedom Williams acquired the federal trademark to use the name "C and C Music Factory" for live performances. Williams toured under that name until renewing his trademark to "C & C Music Factory" in 2014. As of 2014, Williams has owned the trademark rights for the name for all related efforts, not just live performances. Founding producer Clivillés has labeled this "the biggest insult in the world".

Lawsuits
In 1990, The Crew, a group composed of Clivillés, Cole, and Freedom Williams, released the single "Get Dumb! (Free Your Body)". The song featured an unauthorized sample of Boyd Jarvis' 1983 song "The Music Got Me". Jarvis filed a lawsuit against Cole and Clivillés as well as A&M Records. The court ruled in favor of Jarvis.

Following the release of "Gonna Make You Sweat (Everybody Dance Now)" in November 1990, C+C Music Factory was hit with a lawsuit by Martha Wash, whose vocals were uncredited on the chorus. The song used an edited compilation of vocal parts that Wash recorded in June 1990 for an unrelated demo tape. After discovering that the group was using Zelma Davis in the music video, Wash attempted to negotiate with Clivillés and Cole for sleeve credits and royalties, which ultimately proved unsuccessful. On 11 December 1991, Wash filed a lawsuit in the Los Angeles Superior Court against Robert Clivillés and David Cole, charging the producers and their record company, Sony Music Entertainment, with fraud, deceptive packaging, and commercial appropriation. The case was eventually settled in 1994 and as a result of the settlement, Sony made an unprecedented request to MTV to add a disclaimer that credited Wash for vocals and Zelma Davis (who lip-synched Wash's vocals in the official music video) for "visualization" to the "Gonna Make You Sweat" music video.

Discography
Studio albums

Compilations

Singles

Notes
 	Notes A ^'"I Found Love" and "Take a Toke" were released as a double A-side in the UK, charting at number 26 in February 1995.

See also
Clivillés and Cole
List of number-one hits (United States)
List of artists who reached number one on the Hot 100 (U.S.)
List of Number 1 Dance Hits (United States)
List of artists who reached number one on the U.S. Dance chart
MVP

References

External links
 C+C Music Factory at Discogs.com

American house music groups
American dance music groups
Musical groups established in 1989
A&M Records artists
Columbia Records artists
MCA Records artists
PolyGram artists
Sony Music artists

el:Ντέιβιντ Κολ